Storm King was a gasoline-powered sidewheel-driven ferry built in 1915 on Lake Crescent, Washington.

Career
Captain O.D. Treiber designed Storm King for Clallam County's ferry route on Lake Crescent, Washington.

Storm King was named after a mountain overlooking the lake.  Storm King was driven by sidewheels..  On deck, the vessel was 112' long and measured 31.5' on the beam across the sidewheels.  (The hull measurements were 90' long, 20.5' on the beam.)  Storm King, powered by a  Fairbanks-Morse engine, was probably the largest vessel ever on Lake Crescent.  The ferry had a capacity of 21 automobiles and 150 people.

Ferry traffic on Lake Crescent ended in 1922 with the completion of the Olympic Highway along the south side of the lake.

Notes

References 
 Newell, Gordon R., ed., H.W. McCurdy Marine History of the Pacific Northwest,  Superior Publishing (1966)
 Fifth Annual Report of the Industrial Insurance Department For the Twelve Months Ending September 30th 1916, at page 287.

See also
 Betty Earles
 Steamboats of Lake Crescent, Washington

1915 ships
Ferries of Washington (state)
Ships built in Washington (state)
History of Clallam County, Washington
Transportation in Clallam County, Washington